Chunellidae is a family of sea pens, a member of the subclass Octocorallia in the phylum Cnidaria.

Genera
The World Register of Marine Species list the following genera:
Amphiacme Kükenthal, 1903
Chunella Kükenthal, 1902
Porcupinella López-González & Williams, 2011

References

 
Pennatulacea
Cnidarian families